Dorcadion discomaculatum is a species of beetle in the family Cerambycidae. It was described by Pic in 1905. It is known from Iran.

References

discomaculatum
Beetles described in 1905